Kuhpayeh Rural District may refer to:
 Kuhpayeh Rural District (Isfahan Province)
 Kuhpayeh Rural District (Markazi Province)
 Kuhpayeh Rural District (Razavi Khorasan Province)

See also
 Kuhpayeh-e Gharbi Rural District
 Kuhpayeh-e Sharqi Rural District